Chapel and Hill Chorlton is a civil parish in the district of Newcastle-under-Lyme, Staffordshire, England.  The parish contains eight listed buildings that are recorded in the National Heritage List for England.  All the listed buildings are designated at Grade II, the lowest of the three grades, which is applied to "buildings of national importance and special interest".  The parish contains the village of Chapel Chorlton and the surrounding area.  The listed buildings consist of a church, a memorial and a sundial in the churchyard, two farmhouses, a house that was formerly an inn, a former flour mill, and a milepost.


Buildings

References

Citations

Sources

Lists of listed buildings in Staffordshire
Borough of Newcastle-under-Lyme